Bellars is a surname. It may refer to:

Frederick Bellars (1888–1971), American track and field athlete and Olympian
George Bellars (1848-?), New Zealand cricketer
Stephanie Bellars (born 1976), known by her ring name Gorgeous George, American professional wrestling valet[1] and former exotic dancer

See also
Clara Bellar (born 1972), French actress, singer, film director, screenwriter and film producer
Kirby Bellars, a village and civil parish near Melton Mowbray in Leicestershire, England